Daavid (Taavetti) Latveteläinen (19 November 1860 in Maaninka – 1 July 1919 in Helsinki) was a Finnish construction worker and politician. He was a member of the Parliament of Finland from 1911 to 1918, representing the Social Democratic Party of Finland (SDP). During the Finnish Civil War Lapveteläinen was a member of the Central Workers' Council. He was imprisoned after the war and died in detention in 1919.

References

1860 births
1919 deaths
People from Maaninka
People from Kuopio Province (Grand Duchy of Finland)
Social Democratic Party of Finland politicians
Members of the Parliament of Finland (1911–13)
Members of the Parliament of Finland (1913–16)
Members of the Parliament of Finland (1916–17)
Members of the Parliament of Finland (1917–19)
People of the Finnish Civil War (Red side)
Prisoners who died in Finnish detention